Omeyshiyeh-ye Bozorg (also Romanized as ‘Omeyshīyeh-ye Bozorg, ‘Ommūshīyeh-ye Bozorg, and ‘Omowshīyeh-ye Bozorg) is a village in Muran Rural District, in the Soveyseh District of Karun County, Khuzestan Province, Iran. At the 2006 census, its population was 801, in 175 families.

References 

Populated places in Karun County